Oruza albocostata is a species of moth in the family Erebidae first described by Herbert Druce in 1899. It is found in North America.

The MONA or Hodges number for Oruza albocostata is 9026.

References

Further reading

 
 
 

Boletobiinae
Articles created by Qbugbot
Moths described in 1899